Arial is a census-designated place (CDP) in Pickens County, South Carolina, United States. The population was 2,607 at the 2000 census. It is part of the Greenville–Mauldin–Easley Metropolitan Statistical Area.

Geography
Arial is located at  (34.844152, -82.637199).

Demographics

As of the census of 2000, there were 2,607 people, 1,068 households, and 759 families residing in the CDP. The population density was 527.8 people per square mile (203.8/km2). There were 1,179 housing units at an average density of 238.7/sq mi (92.1/km2). The racial makeup of the CDP was 93.82% White, 4.18% African American, 0.08% Native American, 0.15% Asian, 0.96% from other races, and 0.81% from two or more races. Hispanic or Latino of any race were 1.88% of the population.

There were 1,068 households, out of which 28.7% had children under the age of 18 living with them, 56.6% were married couples living together, 8.7% had a female householder with no husband present, and 28.9% were non-families. 25.4% of all households were made up of individuals, and 10.8% had someone living alone who was 65 years of age or older. The average household size was 2.44 and the average family size was 2.89.

In the CDP, the population was spread out, with 23.3% under the age of 18, 9.7% from 18 to 24, 28.0% from 25 to 44, 24.3% from 45 to 64, and 14.7% who were 65 years of age or older. The median age was 37 years. For every 100 females, there were 96.3 males. For every 100 females age 18 and over, there were 94.6 males.

The median income for a household in the CDP was $29,240, and the median income for a family was $36,445. Males had a median income of $29,219 versus $20,511 for females. The per capita income for the CDP was $17,646. About 6.0% of families and 10.8% of the population were below the poverty line, including 7.1% of those under age 18 and 11.3% of those age 65 or over.

References

Census-designated places in Pickens County, South Carolina
Census-designated places in South Carolina
Upstate South Carolina